Juan Camilo Quintero former director of Ruta N and the founder of Tecnnova. Quintero served as Secretary of Productivity for Antioquia, a secretary in the cabinet of former Medellín mayor Anibal Gaviria, and headed Medellín's efforts to host the Youth Olympic Games in 2018.

Writings 

Quintero has written extensively about the impact of Globalization upon Colombia and the need to encourage more entrepreneurship in Latin America. He has worked with and advocated for various organizations to bring more international events to Medellín, Colombia in order to promote the city as secure, prosperous and an ideal tourist destination.

References 

Year of birth missing (living people)
Living people
Colombian politicians